The national seals of Japan comprise the following emblems used for the purpose of authentication by the Emperor and government of Japan:

 The Government Seal of Japan (also called the Paulownia Seal)
 The Imperial Seal of Japan (also called the Chrysanthemum Seal)
 The Privy Seal of Japan
 The State Seal of Japan (also called the Great Seal of Japan)

Gallery

See also
 Mon (emblem)
 Flags of Japan
 Imperial Regalia of Japan
 Chrysanthemum Throne
Japanese honors system

External links 
Emperor Showa signing documents and using the State and Privy Seal of Japan
 Japan Crest free material hakkodaiodo—Detailed commentary on Japanese kamon and a list of images. Free material is eps format. 

 

Japanese monarchy
National symbols of Japan
Japan
Empire of Japan
Japanese coats of arms
Japanese heraldry